Donald J. Carter (July 5, 1933 – February 14, 2018) was an American investor and businessman who was a founding owner of the Dallas Mavericks of the National Basketball Association (NBA) and the Dallas Sidekicks of the Major Indoor Soccer League (MISL). At the time of his death he was a minority partner in the Mavericks and a familiar courtside presence at the team's home games, always wearing a cowboy hat.

Early life
Carter was born into a poor family in Arkansas on July 5, 1933. Carter's mother remarried when he was 15.  He dropped out of high school and got a job at a gas station that paid enough to keep the car he used for drag racing running.

After doing his military service in the U.S. Air Force, he joined his mother, Mary C. Crowley, in the successful company she founded selling interior decoration with a home party plan, Home Interiors and Gifts. The business was sold to Hicks, Muse, Tate & Furst and netted Carter millions of dollars.

Career
Carter, along with Norm Sonju, founded an NBA expansion team, the Dallas Mavericks, in 1980. When Sonju had difficulty securing the funds needed for the US$12 million expansion entry fee, Carter stepped forward to guarantee its payment. This initial investment in the team (US$ in today's terms) eventually earned him US$125 million (US$ in today's terms) when he sold the team in 1996 to an investment group led by Ross Perot Jr.

Over the years, Carter owned many different types of businesses, including a Rolls-Royce dealership.  Other businesses include banks, trucking firms, hotels, rodeo arenas, and cattle ranches. In the 2011 championship win by the Dallas Mavericks over the Miami Heat he was given the honor of receiving the Larry O'Brien trophy by Mark Cuban as the first owner. He retained a minority stake in the Mavericks (4% at the time of his death) and frequently attended Mavericks games until his death in 2018.

Personal life and death
Carter had two sons, Donald J. “Joey” Carter, Jr. and Ronald L. Carter, and a daughter, Christi Carter Urschel with his wife of 58 years, Linda Jo.

Carter died at his home in Dallas, Texas on February 14, 2018, at the age of 84.

See also 
Dallas Mavericks
Dallas Sidekicks

References

Bibliography

External links
 Drape, Joe. "Mavericks' Founder Finally Gets His Title," The New York Times, Sunday, June 19, 2011.

1933 births
2018 deaths
American soccer chairmen and investors
American sports businesspeople
Dallas Mavericks owners
Businesspeople from Arkansas
20th-century American businesspeople